Joe Nolan (March 21, 1929 – September 29, 1986) was an ice hockey defenceman whose career spanned six seasons across two leagues.

Playing career
Nolan started the 1955-56 season as a member of the Clinton Comets. On November 7, 1955, Nolan was signed by the Clinton Comets after defenceman Jim Johnson was waived from the team. Nolan finished the season leading the league in penalty minutes with 352 PIMs. Nolan's 352 PIMs were a league record and also marked the first time that a player accumulated over 300 penalty minutes in a season. Nolan's staggering penalty minutes gave him an unofficial reward for most individual penalty minutes in a season, which he won back to back years in 1955-1956 and 1956-1957.

On December 12, 1956, Nolan was released from the Clinton Comets. At the time, Nolan led the league in penalty minutes. Upon his release, Nolan was signed by the Johnstown Jets for whom he then  appeared in only five playoff games before retiring.

Acting career
Nolan would retire from hockey in 1956, but would return to Johnstown, Pennsylvania two decades later in a minor role for the movie Slap Shot.

Nolan would assume the role of Clarence "Screaming Buffalo" Swamptown, a player who Chiefs players thought "was suspended forever" until he was introduced at the Federal League championship game. In real life, Nolan was not suspended for life - or at all - due to misconduct. Some of the promotional material for Slap Shot, specifically statements made by the Carlson brothers and Dave Hanson, suggested that Nolan had been banned for life from pro hockey "for some reason." Nolan was investigated for gambling, but was not suspended. If he had been suspended for life as the promotional material stated, he would have been ineligible to work as an official, which he did for a number of years after his retirement.

Personal
Nolan was a full-blooded Ojibwa Indian. He came from a large family of four brothers and five sisters, the son of Clement and Veronica Nolan.

Upon retiring from the EHL, Nolan returned to Clinton, New York to reside, but eventually came back to the Eastern Hockey League as a linesman who was respected by players Nolan would continue to reside there until his death in 1986.

References

External links
 

1929 births
Canadian ice hockey defencemen
Eastern Hockey League players
Ice hockey people from Ontario
Johnstown Jets players
Sportspeople from Sault Ste. Marie, Ontario
First Nations sportspeople
Ojibwe people
1991 deaths
Canadian expatriate ice hockey players in the United States